Kampung Seronok is a small village in Southwest Penang Island District, Penang, Malaysia. This village is located between Bayan Lepas and Batu Maung.

Southwest Penang Island District
Villages in Penang